Caenorhabditis inopinata - prior to 2017 referred to as C. sp. 34. - is a sister species to C. elegans (it is classified in the 'Elegans' supergroup).

The specific epithet comes from the Latin inopinus (“unexpected”).

This gonochoristic (male-female) species was isolated from figs (Ficus septica) and fig wasps in Ishigaki Island, in Japan. It was recovered by N. Kanzaki in 2013. It is a larger species than C. elegans.

Its genome is being sequenced at the University of Miyazaki.

References

External links 
 Caenorhabditis inopinata sequencing project at NCBI
 Caenorhabditis inopinata sequencing project at trace.ddbj.nig.ac.jp

inopinata
Nematodes described in 2013
Fauna of Japan